Deputy's Pass is a national nature reserve of approximately  located in County Wicklow, Ireland. It is managed by the Irish National Parks & Wildlife Service.

Features
Deputy's Pass was legally protected as a national nature reserve by the Irish government in 1982. The reserve is also listed as a Special Area of Conservation.

The name Deputy's Pass is derived from the Battle of Deputy's Pass, during which the English army cut a pass through the woodland.

The woodland at Deputy's Pass was originally a coppice, and would have been part of the larger Glenealy oak woods. The woods are composed of sessile oak, holly, hazel, birch and beech, with an under planting of wood sorrel, blueberry, bilberry, and woodrush. The Potter River runs through the site, with fauna that include kestrels, wrens, smooth newts and common frogs. There is a 2km walking trail within the reserve.

References

Geography of County Wicklow
Forests and woodlands of the Republic of Ireland
Nature reserves in the Republic of Ireland
Tourist attractions in County Wicklow
Special Areas of Conservation in the Republic of Ireland